The 2014 Croydon Council election took place on 22 May 2014 to elect members of Croydon Council in England. This was on the same day as other local elections.

Overall Results 

|}

{| style="width:65%; text-align:center;"
|+ ↓
|- style="color:white;"
| style="background:; width:57.142%;" | 40
| style="background:; width:42.857%;" | 30
|-
| 
|

Results by Ward

Addiscombe

Ashburton

Bensham Manor

Broad Green

Coulsdon East

Coulsdon West

Croham

Fairfield

Fieldway

Heathfield

Kenley

New Addington

Norbury

Purley

Sanderstead

Selhurst

Selsdon & Ballards

Shirley

South Norwood

Thornton Heath

Upper Norwood

Waddon

West Thornton

Woodside

Elected Members

References

Croydon
2014